Enrique R. Vivoni is a Puerto Rican scientist and engineer specializing in hydrology who studies the interactions of water throughout the atmosphere, biosphere, and lithosphere. His research is focused on the southwestern United States and Mexico for the purpose of improving water management in urban and rural settings.

Early life and higher education 
Vivoni was born in 1975 in San Juan, Puerto Rico. He states that his curiosity with water started from a young age, in particular through his involvement in Scouting in Guajataka. He also credits his childhood in Puerto Rico with fostering a belief in the values of cross-cultural education and of inclusion and diversity in research. Vivoni was a 1993 Presidential Scholar, and graduated from the Massachusetts Institute of Technology in 1996 with a B.S. in Environmental Engineering and in 1998 with an M.S. in Fluid Mechanics. In 2003, he received a Ph.D. in hydrology from MIT, under the mentorship of professors Dara Entekhabi and Rafael L. Bras. He wrote his dissertation, titled Hydrologic modeling using triangulated irregular networks : terrain representation, flood forecasting and catchment response on modeling watershed systems, specifically looking at predicting flooding using novel computational methods.

Career in research and leadership 
Vivoni currently serves as the Associate Dean of the Graduate College at Arizona State University, and is also a professor in the School of Earth and Space Exploration and the School of Sustainable Engineering and the Built Environment. He previously served as an associate professor at New Mexico Institute of Mining and Technology from 2003 to 2009. In his capacity as Associate Dean, he has focused on thought leadership on US-Mexico education, on supporting postdoctoral researchers and international graduate students, and on interdisciplinary efforts to mobilize knowledge.

References

1975 births
Living people
American hydrologists
Arizona State University faculty
MIT School of Engineering alumni
People from San Juan, Puerto Rico